The following are the national records in athletics in Liberia maintained by the Liberia Athletics Federation (LAF).

Outdoor

Key to tables:

A = affected by altitude

OT = oversized track (> 200m in circumference)

Men

Women

Indoor

Men

Women

Notes

References
General
World Athletics Statistic Handbook 2019: National Outdoor Records
World Athletics Statistic Handbook 2022: National Indoor Records
Specific

Liberia
Records
Athletics